"What If" is a song written by Diane Warren and recorded by American singer Brenda K. Starr for her 1991 album By Heart. The song was later covered by Belgian jazz band Vaya Con Dios on their 1995 album Roots and Wings and by American country singer Reba McEntire in 1997.

Reba McEntire version 
In November 1997, American country singer Reba McEntire released a cover of the song as a benefit single for The Salvation Army. All proceeds from sales of the commercial single and artist, label, and writer royalties were donated to the organization. McEntire premiered the song during halftime at a Dallas Cowboys and Tennessee Oilers game in Dallas, Texas on November 20, 1997. The song reached number 23 on the Billboard Hot Country Songs chart and number 50 on the Billboard Hot 100.

In May 2020, McEntire re-released the single to digital and streaming retailers amidst the COVID-19 pandemic. A new music video was released featuring clips of healthcare workers, caregivers, and others interwoven with footage from the original 1997 video.

Chart positions

References

1991 songs
1997 singles
Reba McEntire songs
Brenda K. Starr songs
Vaya Con Dios (band) songs
Songs written by Diane Warren
Song recordings produced by David Malloy
Charity singles
MCA Records singles
Music videos directed by John Lloyd Miller